The Bangkok BRT is a bus rapid transit system in Bangkok, Thailand. Of five routes that were originally planned, only one line has been operating since 2010, with the other routes cancelled. Bangkok Metropolitan Administration (BMA) announced the whole system might be cancelled at the end of April 2017 due to low ridership and financial losses, however a subsequent opinion survey carried out by the BMA found there was a demand for the service to be retained. In March 2017 the Bangkok Governor announced the service would continue, with increased ticket prices and changed operator to Bangkok Mass Transit System Public Company Limited.

The  route has twelve stations in the centre of the road that give at grade access to the right hand side of the buses. Both termini connect to the Silom Line of the BTS Skytrain; at Chong Nonsi (S3) and at the newly opened Talat Phlu (S10). The buses used are all Sunlong SLK6125CNG buses. The flat fare is 15 baht.

Background
It is owned by Krungthep Thanakom PCL, the holdings enterprise of the Bangkok Metropolitan Administration (BMA), and operated by Bangkok Mass Transit System PCL (BTSC), the operator of the BTS Skytrain.

Plans for a bus rapid transit system in Bangkok were made in 2004 by the BMA and the Ministry of Transport's Office of Transport and Traffic Policy and Planning. In 2005, the BMA settled on a master plan consisting of fourteen BRT routes. Construction on the first route, Sathon–Ratchaphruek, began in 2007. The route opened for trial runs on 29 May 2010, and officially opened on 14 February 2011.

The system's island platforms are accessed by elevated enclosed station facilities, and it shares the ticketing system of the BTS Skytrain. The buses run on dedicated bus lanes blocked to the main traffic, which is why even after three years since its inception, the system is still being criticised by motorists as they feel that losing one lane to the BRT has worsened the traffic in the area.

Originally, five BRT routes were planned to be open by 2013. The additional four routes were: Mo Chit – Government Complex – Nonthaburi, Sathon – Suk Sawat, Don Mueang – Min Buri–Suvarnabhumi, and Min Buri – Srinagarindra – Samrong. However, it was announced in September 2010 that The Mo Chit – Government Complex route was cancelled, and the other planned routes were expected to be abandoned as well.

Sathon–Ratchaphruek route 

The first route from Sathon to Ratchaphruek via Narathiwat Ratchanakharin and Rama III roads, opened to the public on 29 May 2010. This was later than 12 August 2008 as originally planned. The service ran as a free trial until the end of August 2010, followed by a flat fare of THB10 from September 2010. That flat fare was decreased to THB5 in January 2011, and later increase to THB15 in May 2017.

Part of the route is physically separated from the remaining carriageway by way of surface-mounted dividers, while other parts of the route are high-occupancy vehicle lanes with a minimum occupancy level of three occupants (T3). At some intersections, the bus has to share space with other vehicles, disrupting an efficient exploitation. The vehicles have a guide system, which is only used at the stations to ensure a minimum gap between the station and the bus.  The stations are all located in the centre of the road, which means that the BRT lanes are located against the road median, and the doors are on the right hand side of the buses (Thailand drives on the left). Access from the stations to the vehicles is leveled, but are in some way accessible by ramps for physically handicapped.

Stations

See also
 List of bus rapid transit systems
 Rabbit Card

References

External links

 Cabride video of entire line
 Airport Rail Link, BTS, MRT & BRT network map

Bus rapid transit
Bus transport in Bangkok
2010 establishments in Thailand